Several species of blenny, a fish share the name Sailfin blenny:

Emblemaria pandionis
Microlipophrys velifer